The MT-LB (literally "multi-purpose towing vehicle light armored") is a Soviet multi-purpose, fully amphibious, tracked armored fighting vehicle in use since the 1970s. It was also produced in Poland, where (starting in the mid-1990s) its YaMZ engine was replaced by a Polish 6-cylinder SW 680 diesel engine.

Development
In the 1950s, the Soviet Central Auto and Tractor Directorate began a development program to replace the AT-P series of artillery tractors (which were based on the ASU-57 airborne self-propelled gun) with a new generation of vehicles. The MT-L was developed to meet this requirement based on the PT-76 amphibious light tank chassis. The MT-LB is the armored variant of the MT-L. Entering production in the early 1970s, it was cheap to build, being based on many existing components, e.g. the engine, which was originally developed for trucks. It is built at the Kharkiv Tractor Plant and Bulgaria. Formerly it was also manufactured under license in Poland by Huta Stalowa Wola

Description
The crew, a driver and a commander/gunner, sit in a compartment at the front of the vehicle, with the engine behind them. A load of  can be towed. The vehicle is fully amphibious, being propelled by its tracks in the water.

A small turret at the front of the vehicle fits a 7.62 mm PKT machine gun with 360-degree manual traverse and an elevation of −5 to +30 degrees.

Several weapon systems are based on this hull (for example Strela-10 or SNAR-10).

Variants

Former USSR

 MT-L
 MT-LB (izdeliye 6) – basic model, often used as simple APC but also as artillery tractor or ambulance. In the West the term MT-LB Blade or MT-LB M1980 is used for vehicles that are fitted with a hydraulic dozer blade.

Russian Federation
 MT-LBM (izdeliye 6M) – MT-LB modernization developed by Muromteplovoz in the 1990s. It can be fitted with several different turrets.
 2S24 – mortar carrier with 2B24 (or 2B14 "Podnos") 82 mm mortar and 83 rounds. The GRAU designation for the carrier vehicle, mortar, and ammunition is 2K32 "Deva". The 2S24 was designed by TsNII "Burevestnik" and has a crew of five. In service with RF Interior Ministry.
 MT-LBVMK – a modification of MT-LBVM with "Kord" 12.7 mm machine gun instead of NSVT 12.7 mm.
 Toros – Arctic adapted vehicle developed by Muromteplovoz based on the MT-LB chassis, armed with a 30mm autocannon 2A42, PKMT 7.62mm machine gun, and 30mm AGS-17D grenade launcher, and equipped with a snowplow. Toros is able to operate in −45 °C.
 MT-LB Unknown Naval Turret Conversion – a modification of MT-LB with what appears to be a turreted dual anti aircraft gun of around 20mm or larger has been sighted in footage from the Ukraine war. The turret on a raised pedestal appears to have come from naval vessels.

Bulgaria
  Bulgaria has various models of the MT-LB in service, as of 2016. Along with the base model, between 1971 and 2012 Bulgaria manufactures MT-LB VM variation with improved snow and swamp-going capabilities.

East Germany
 MT-LB (Pi) – combat engineer vehicle.
 MT-LB (Pzj) – version for anti-tank units.
 MT-LB (Pzj Fü) – command vehicle for anti-tank units.
 MT-LB (BO) SFL – battery command vehicle in self-propelled artillery units.
 San MT-LB – ambulance
 MTP-LB – technical support vehicle.

Iraq

 MT-LB converted into a SPAAG by mounting a ZU-23-2 23×152mm twin anti-aircraft gun on the rear part of the vehicle. The gun had its wheels removed and as such cannot be easily dismounted and used separately. There were at least two variations of this conversion; one with the ZU-23-2 mounted in an open-topped turret, the other with the ZU-23-2 mounted on a platform extending beyond the hull of the MT-LB with a roof for the gun operators. The second version was most likely intended to be used in a fire support role, as the roof would hinder the gun's sights at high elevation.

Poland
Polish HSW S.A. (Huta Stalowa Wola S.A.) license produced MT-LB since 1976, and it also developed a modified chassis SPG-2, with better floating capabilities.
 MT-LB-2AP – APC variant with a turret from SKOT-2AP, armed with high elevation 14.5mm KPVT MG and 7.62mm PKT CMG. Prototype only.
 WEM Lotos – medical evacuation vehicle with four stretchers.
 WPT Mors – armored recovery and repair vehicle, produced from 1983.
 R-137T (radiostacja ruchoma UKF) – signals vehicle with VHF radio set R-137. Entered service in 1987 and has a range of 70 to 150 km.
 ZWD-1 "Irys" (zautomatyzowany wóz dowodzenia) – command vehicle, belongs to the automated command set "Irys".
 MT-LB-23M "Krak" – APC variant with a 23 mm gun in an unmanned turret. Prototype only.
 Promet – self-propelled AA gun with twin 23 mm guns, from 1979. Four prototypes only.
 "Przebiśnieg" – electronic warfare system, consists of three different vehicles:
 SZ or MT-LB Z (stacja zakłóceń) – EW/Jamming vehicle;
 SR or MT-LB R (stacja rozpoznania) – Comint/Sigint vehicle;
 WD krel – command post vehicle (wóz dowodzenia kompanii radioelektronicznej).
 SPG-2 – much-modified base vehicle, with reworked nose section and hydro jets for better floating:
 TRI Hors – engineering reconnaissance vehicle, built in series from 1983, armed with 12.7mm NSVT AAMG mounted on a turret;
 WPT Mors-II – armored recovery and repair vehicle, produced from 1986, armed with 12.7mm NSVT AAMG mounted on a turret;
 Opal-I and Opal-II – artillery command vehicles, with a turret with NSWT-12.7 Utios: Opal-I with a 245 hp (180 kW) turbocharged diesel engine SW680/167/1, Opal-II with a 300 hp (220 kW) engine SW680T (YaMZ-238N) and a longer chassis with 7 road wheels on each side. Prototypes only.

 BWO-40 – infantry fighting vehicle with 40 mm Bofors gun. A similar turret was mounted on the BWP-40 (BMP-1 upgrade). Prototype only.

Sweden

 Pbv 401 (pansarbandvagn) – modified a former East-German vehicle with 7.62 mm machine guns Ksp 95 and Ksp 58.

Ukraine 

 MT-LB-12 – A 2022 modification in which a MT-12 Rapira 100 mm anti-tank gun was mounted on top of the vehicle with an open-topped superstructure for cover. At least two made with more planned. During the 2022 Russian invasion of Ukraine, Ukraine also deployed improvised chop-jobs combining the hulls of the MT-LB with the 85 mm divisional gun D-44.

Operators

Current operators
 
  – 336
  – 31

  –  134
  Boko Haram – Captured from the Nigerian Army.
  – 100 
  – 70
  – 6
  – 10
  – 389 MT-LB/v, 50 MT-LBU
  – 66 in Service
  – About 400 in Service.
  – 150

  – 60
  – 26
  – 67
  – unknown number of HT-16PGJ based on Strela-10
  – 10
  People's Defense Units (YPG)
  – 3,300 in active service. Currently being modernized in the version MLBSh for the Marines with more powerful engines KAMAZ-740.50 of 360 hp, new tracks and new weaponry, etc. They are also being upgraded to the version VM1K for the Ground Forces with a domestic 310 hp YAMZ-238BL-1 engine and a new radio station. Some are being equipped as platforms for ZU-23 anti-aircraft guns.
  Transnistria
 – 2,090. In 2018 nine MT-LBs received from Poland (those vehicles were previously in Polish service).
  – 5
  – Used by opposing force units for training purposes.

Former operators
  – 6 SNAR-10 stored, for scrap.
  Czechoslovakia – Passed on to the Czech Republic.
  – 721 Bulgarian-made MT-LBs, 32 SNAR-10 and 36 Strela-10M. Unified with West Germany.
  – taken from GDR's army, all scrapped or sold to other countries.
  – Strela-10 and SNAR-10
 
  – 10 retired.
  – 15 retired
  – Passed on to successor states.
  – 460 (Locally designated Pbv 401, former East German, bought in 1993, then decommissioned gradually until the last 147 examples were sold to Finland in 2011)

See also
 M113 armored personnel carrier
 BMP-1
 BMP-2
 BMP-3
 BTR-50 – a similar vehicle based on PT-76 light tank
 List of AFVs

Notes

References
 *

External links
 
 Huta Stalowa Wola – producer of MT-LB
 Russia upgrades firepower for MT-LB Jane's, 26 September 2006
 fas.org
 inetres.com

Armoured personnel carriers of the Soviet Union
Armoured personnel carriers of the Cold War
Amphibious armoured personnel carriers
Military vehicles introduced in the 1950s